Kinetik is the second and final album by industrial metal band Omega Lithium.  It was released on 27 May 2011.

Track listing

Personnel
Mya Mortensen – vocals
Malice Rime – guitars, synthesizers, backing vocals
Zoltan Harpax – bass
Torsten Nihill – drums, percussion

Guest musicians
Choir on Track 1 performed by Matija Bizjan, Darko Vidić, Matjaž Prah
Croatian Traditional Choir Klapa on Track 3 performed by Vokalisti Salone 
Istrian traditional instrument Sopele on Track 8 performed by Zoran Karlić

Production
Produced by Žare Pak and Marko Matijević Sekul (aka Malice Rime).
Recorded by Benjamin Schäfer at Horus Studio Hannover (Germany) and by Žare Pak at Kif Kif Studio Ljubljana (Slovenia) - October 2010.
Drum engineered by Ralf "Rossi" Rossberg.
Mixed by Benjamin Schäfer at Horus Studio Hannover (Germany) - January to February 2011.
Mastered by Vincent Sorg at the Principal Studios Munster (Germany) - February 2011.
Remix mastered by Michael Krzizek at Ultimate Mastering Hannover (Germany) - March 2011.
Artwork by Seth Siro Anton
Webdesign and graphics by Hichami Haddaji

References

2011 albums
Omega Lithium albums
Albums with cover art by Spiros Antoniou
Drakkar Entertainment albums